Major Joseph Hamilton Daveiss (March 4, 1774 – November 7, 1811), a Virginia-born lawyer, received a mortal wound while commanding the Dragoons of the Kentucky Militia at the Battle of Tippecanoe. Five years earlier, Daviess had tried to warn President Thomas Jefferson about Aaron Burr's plans to provoke rebellion in Spanish-held territories southwest of his Kentucky district. Several places in the United States are named for Daveiss, but though he spelled his name "Daveiss", these places all have the spelling "Daviess".

Early and family life
Daveiss was born on March 4, 1774, in Bedford County, Virginia. He moved at a young age with his parents to Kentucky, first to Lincoln County. The family eventually settled near Danville in Boyle County. He studied classics at a private academy in Harrodsburg, then read law. In 1793, he volunteered in a military campaign against Native Americans. He married Chief Justice John Marshall's sister Nancy, and returned to Kentucky.

Legal career
Admitted to the Kentucky bar in 1795, Daviess settled in Danville but also practiced in nearby locations. He became known for his eccentricities, not accompanying other lawyers "riding the circuit" but riding through the backcountry alone, and often appeared in court dressed as a backwoodsman. He also aligned with the Federalist political party, although the Democratic Republicans were more popular in the state. Like many Kentucky lawyers, Daviess owned enslaved people, seven in the 1810 census.

In 1799, Daviess assisted John Rowan as his second in a duel, in which Rowan mortally wounded his antagonist, then fled, so Daviess also became a fugitive for a time. When Rowan turned himself into authorities, Daviess defended him at trial, and achieved an acquittal. Daviess became the first lawyer west of the Appalachian Mountains to argue a case before the United States Supreme Court.

Following his trip to Washington and marriage, Daveiss received an appointment as United States Attorney for Kentucky. In February and March 1806, as U.S. Attorney, he wrote President Thomas Jefferson several letters warning him of possible conspiratorial activities by Aaron Burr, who at that point was a former vice president of the United States. Daveiss' July 14 letter to Jefferson stated flatly that Burr planned to provoke a rebellion in Spanish-held parts of the West in order to join them to areas in the Southwest to form an independent nation under his rule. Similar accusations were appearing against local Democratic-Republicans in a Frankfort, Kentucky newspaper, Western World, and Jefferson dismissed Daveiss' accusations against Burr, a Democratic-Republican, as politically motivated.

In 1806, Daveiss brought treason charges against Burr in Kentucky. The charges were, however, dismissed thanks to the help of Burr's attorney, Henry Clay. Burr faced federal charges of treason in 1807 but was acquitted at trial, which made Daviess unpopular. He published "A View of the President's Conduct concerning the Conspiracy of 1806" in 1807.

Battle of Tippecanoe
In 1811, Daveiss volunteered to serve in the Indiana militia, answering Governor Harrison's call for troops to march against Tecumseh's village at Prophetstown. He was placed in command of two companies of dragoons, and all the cavalry in Harrison's army.

On the night of November 6, 1811, Harrison's army made camp near Prophetstown. Major Daveiss' dragoons occupied a position in the rear of the left flank. The dragoons were instructed to fight dismounted, with pistols, as a reserve in the event of a night attack. When the Indians attacked early the next morning, Major Daveiss advanced toward the heaviest fire with a small detachment. He was driven back, and mortally wounded in the process. He died soon after.

At the time of the Battle of Tippecanoe, Daveiss was serving as the eighth Grand Master of Masons of the Grand Lodge of Kentucky.  He was a member of Lexington Lodge #1. The Tippecanoe battlefield has a memorial marker as well as a gravestone.

Places named after Daveiss 
 Jo Daviess County, Illinois
 Daviess County, Indiana
 Daviess County, Kentucky
 Daviess County, Missouri
 Jo Daviess Township, Minnesota

References

Further reading

External links 
 Who was Jo Daviess?

1774 births
1811 deaths
American military personnel killed in the War of 1812
United States Army personnel of the War of 1812
Indiana Territory officials
Kentucky lawyers
People from Bedford County, Virginia
People from Danville, Kentucky
People from Indiana in the War of 1812
United States Attorneys for the District of Kentucky
American Freemasons
United States Army officers